A peritomy is a procedure carried out during eye surgery, where an incision is made around the limbus, usually to expose the sclera and/or extraocular muscles for a variety of surgical procedures.

References

Eye surgery